Namita D'souza (born 26 April 2003) is an Indian-born cricketer who plays for the United Arab Emirates national cricket team. In July 2018, she was named in the United Arab Emirates' squad for the 2018 ICC Women's World Twenty20 Qualifier tournament. She made her Women's Twenty20 International (WT20I) for the United Arab Emirates against Thailand in the World Twenty20 Qualifier on 12 July 2018.

References

External links
 

2003 births
Living people
Emirati women cricketers
United Arab Emirates women Twenty20 International cricketers
Indian emigrants to the United Arab Emirates
Indian expatriate sportspeople in the United Arab Emirates
Place of birth missing (living people)